Baptist Health Sciences University, formerly Baptist College of Health Sciences, is a private, coeducational, specialized college in Memphis, Tennessee operated by Baptist Memorial Health Care. The school was created through the expansion of the School of Nursing (est. 1912) and School of Radiologic Technology (est. 1956) from diploma programs into a college in 1994. It offers Bachelor's degrees in the following fields:

Biomedical Sciences
Diagnostic Medical sonography Accredited by Commission on Accreditation of Allied Health Education Programs in collaboration with Joint Review Committee on Education in Diagnostic Medical Sonography.
Health Administration
Medical Imaging Sciences
Medical Radiography Accredited by the Joint Review Committee on Education in Radiologic Technology.
Medical Laboratory Science Initial accreditation pending from National Accrediting Agency for Clinical Laboratory Sciences.
Neurodiagnostic Technology Associate Degree and Bachelor's Degree
Nuclear Medicine Accredited by the Joint Review Committee on Educational Programs in Nuclear Medicine Technology.
Nursing Accredited by the Commission on Collegiate Nursing Education. RN to BSN Completion Program, Bachelor's of Sciences in Nursing, and Doctor of Nursing Practice programs.
Population Health
Pre-Health Studies Associate's Degree
Radiation Therapy Accredited by the Joint Review Committee on Education in Radiologic Technology.
Respiratory Care Accredited by the Commission on Accreditation for Respiratory Care.

References

External links

Universities and colleges in Memphis, Tennessee
Nursing schools in Tennessee
Private universities and colleges in Tennessee
Educational institutions established in 1912
Universities and colleges accredited by the Southern Association of Colleges and Schools
1912 establishments in Tennessee